Derrick Shaun Williams (born 17 January 1993) is a professional footballer who plays as a centre back for Major League Soccer club D.C. United. He is a product of the Aston Villa Academy, having signed as a youngster from his local side Tramore AFC in County Waterford, and also played in England for Bristol City and Blackburn Rovers. Born in Germany, he represented the Republic of Ireland internationally.

Early life
Williams was born in Hamburg, Germany in 1993, to an Irish-American mother and an African-American father. With his father serving in the United States Army at the time, Williams moved regularly during spells in Germany and the United States. In 2000, when Williams was seven years old, the family eventually settled in Waterford in Ireland. It was here where he began playing football, and was later spotted playing for Tramore AFC and Waterford. At the age of 15, Manchester United offered him a contract, however he decided to join Aston Villa instead in January 2009, due to their success in developing academy players into first team players.

Club career

Aston Villa
Following a number of injuries to Alex McLeish's first team squad in the latter stages of the 2011–12 season, the versatile defender was brought in to train with the first team on a number of occasions. His first competitive involvement with the first team saw him earn a place on the bench for the defeats to Arsenal and Chelsea, and the draw with Liverpool.

Williams made his first-team debut under Paul Lambert, as a substitute in Villa's 1–1 Premier League draw against Queens Park Rangers on 1 December 2012.

Bristol City
After struggling to make it into the Aston Villa first team, Williams signed for Bristol City, newly relegated to League One, on a three-year contract on 24 June 2013. He made his debut in a 2–0 away win at Gillingham in the League Cup on 6 August, and continued to solidify his place in the line up, starting almost every league match for City that season. His first professional goal came on 15 February 2014, in a 2–2 draw at home to Tranmere Rovers.

Bristol City started the 2014–15 League One season with a 16-match unbeaten run, a club record, and the second longest unbeaten run in the country at the time, only behind Chelsea. Williams was a key fixture in this run, starting every match. His first goal of the season came in this run, in a 3–2 home win over Chesterfield on 11 October, and his second was scored in a Football League Trophy win over Coventry City in early December. Williams was sent off for the first time in his career in a 1–0 away defeat at the hands of Crewe Alexandra, forcing him to miss the following match. Williams played in the Football League Trophy final at Wembley Stadium on 22 March 2015, a match in which City beat Walsall 2–0, becoming the only side to have won the competition three times. He was a regular in the City side that confirmed promotion to the Championship with three matches of the season still to go.

Blackburn Rovers
On 26 August 2016, Williams joined Championship club Blackburn Rovers on a three-year contract. He scored his first goal for the club in a 1–1 draw against Cardiff City where he found the equaliser in the 90th minute of the match. In his first season with the club, he managed to make 39 appearances in the league and three in the FA Cup. He was also named as the Player of the Season.

LA Galaxy
On 4 March 2021, Williams moved to the United States and joined Major League Soccer club LA Galaxy after his contract with Blackburn Rovers was cancelled by mutual consent.

D.C. United
On 10 November 2022, Williams was traded to D.C. United in exchange for  $180,000 in General Allocation Money.

International career
Williams was eligible to play for Germany, the United States, and the Republic of Ireland. In February 2011, he made his debut for the Republic of Ireland U19 team against Croatia U19, before going onto play in three of Ireland's four fixtures of the UEFA European Under-19 Championship later that year. On 10 September 2012, Williams made his debut for the Republic of Ireland U21 team, in a 4–2 victory over Italy U21. On 28 May 2018, he made his full senior international debut for the Republic of Ireland national football team in a friendly game against France at the Stade De France.

Williams scored his first senior goal in a friendly against New Zealand on Thursday, 14 November 2019

Career statistics

Club

International

Scores and results list the Republic of Ireland's goal tally first, score column indicates score after each Williams goal.

Honours
Bristol City
Football League Trophy: 2014–15
Football League One: 2014–15

Blackburn Rovers
EFL League One runner-up: 2017–18

Individual
Blackburn Rovers Player of the Season: 2016–17

See also
 List of Republic of Ireland international footballers born outside the Republic of Ireland
 Military brat (U.S. subculture)

References

External links
Derrick Williams profile at the Blackburn Rovers F.C. website
Derrick Williams profile at the Football Association of Ireland website

1993 births
Living people
Republic of Ireland association footballers
Association football defenders
Aston Villa F.C. players
Bristol City F.C. players
Blackburn Rovers F.C. players
LA Galaxy players
D.C. United players
Premier League players
English Football League players
Republic of Ireland youth international footballers
Republic of Ireland under-21 international footballers
Republic of Ireland international footballers
Republic of Ireland expatriate association footballers
Irish expatriate sportspeople in England
Expatriate footballers in England
German footballers
Sportspeople from Waterford (city)
Footballers from Hamburg
Irish people of African-American descent
Black Irish sportspeople
Major League Soccer players
German people of African-American descent
German people of American descent
German people of Irish descent
Irish people of American descent